Ellen Covey is an American neurobiologist, researcher, perfumer and professor in the Department of Psychology at the University of Washington. Member Association for Research in Otolaryngology, Society for Neurosci., European Neurosci. Association, Sigma Xi.

Early life and career 
Born in the United States, Covey's family moved throughout Europe and lived in Switzerland, France, Germany, and Italy during her childhood. She studied premed at the University of Houston and received a master's degree in biology from the University of Texas. At Duke University, she studied chemical senses for her dissertation and got a post-doc at Princeton studying the visual system. She lives in North Seattle Washington, and is a professor of Department of Psychology and affiliate of the Bloedel Hearing Research Center at the University of Washington. Her work centers on mammalian central nervous system, with a research focus on the auditory process of bats and echolocation.

As a perfumer, Covey is the founder and perfumer of Olympic Orchids Artisan Perfumes. She won the 2015 Art & Olfaction Award Artisan prize for Olympic Orchid's Woodcut in and placed as a 2014 Artisan category finalist for Olympic Orchid's Blackbird. She also has collaborated with Canadian perfume house Zoologist on Bat (2016), which won the Independent prize at the 2016 Art and Olfaction Awards. Bat was discontinued in 2019  when Zoologist began moving toward a business model where all fragrances would be produced by a single manufacturer. Covey declined to sell Bat's proprietary formula, instead re-releasing the fragrance under the Olympic Orchids label as Night Flyer in 2020.

Covey also runs an orchid nursery, which instigated and informs her work as a perfumer. Her interest in orchids started at the Duke Medical Center's Immunobiology Department, when she received several orchid plants from a faculty member.

Creations

Olympic Orchids

Zoologist 
 Bat (2016)

References 

Living people
University of Houston alumni
University of Texas alumni
University of Washington faculty
Perfumers
1947 births